Herman Johan "Suus" Suselbeek (born 27 November 1943) is a retired rower from the Netherlands, who won the silver medal in the coxed pairs at the 1968 Summer Olympics, alongside Hadriaan van Nes and coxswain Roderick Rijnders.

References

External links

 
 

1943 births
Living people
People from Oude IJsselstreek
Dutch male rowers
Rowers at the 1968 Summer Olympics
Olympic rowers of the Netherlands
Olympic silver medalists for the Netherlands
Olympic medalists in rowing
Medalists at the 1968 Summer Olympics
Sportspeople from Gelderland